Daniel R. Brooks  is a professor emeritus of Evolutionary Biology at the University of Toronto. He specializes in biodiversity, systematics, and conservation biology.

In 2004, he was elected as a fellow of the Royal Society of Canada.

References

Living people
Year of birth missing (living people)
Fellows of the Royal Society of Canada
Evolutionary biologists
Academic staff of the University of Toronto
Place of birth missing (living people)
University of Nebraska–Lincoln alumni
University of Mississippi alumni